Carmenta suffusata is a moth of the family Sesiidae. It was described by George Paul Engelhardt in 1946. It is known from the United States, including Florida, Oklahoma and Kansas.

References

Sesiidae
Moths described in 1946